Bonin normally refers to the Bonin Islands, a Japanese island chain SSE of the Home Islands in the North Pacific.

Bonin may also refer to:

Places
Bonin, Masovian Voivodeship (east-central Poland)
Bonin, Choszczno County in West Pomeranian Voivodeship (north-west Poland)
Bonin, Drawsko County in West Pomeranian Voivodeship (north-west Poland)
Bonin, Koszalin County in West Pomeranian Voivodeship (north-west Poland)
Bonin, Łobez County in West Pomeranian Voivodeship (north-west Poland)
Bonin, part of the Jeżyce district of Poznań (western Poland)

Other uses
Bonin (surname)

See also 
 Bonin-Ogródki in Masovian Voivodeship (east-central Poland)
 Bonini
 Bonnin (disambiguation)
 Boning (disambiguation)